Onionskin or onion skin is a thin, lightweight, strong, often translucent paper.  Though not made from onions, it superficially resembles their thin, papery skins. It was usually used with carbon paper for typing duplicates in a typewriter, for permanent records where low bulk was important, or for airmail correspondence.  It is typically 25–39 g/m2 (9-pound basis weight in US units), and may be white or canary-colored.

In the typewriter era, onion skin often had a deeply textured cockle finish which allowed for easier erasure of typing mistakes, but other glazed and unglazed finishes were also available then and may be more common today.

Onionskin paper is relatively durable and lightweight due to its high content of cotton fibers. Because of these attributes and its crispness when folding, onionskin paper is one of the best papers to use for toy kites and advanced paper airplanes. Paper airplanes made from onionskin paper tend to fly very well due to their low weight and high integrity once folded.

Onionskin paper has also been regularly used in traditional cel animation. Due to its translucency, it is used as a guide in drawing the frames between key-frames. This is a process that animators refer to as "in-betweening". The process of "onionskinning" is also used in digital animation where frames are represented by digital layers in a production.

References

Paper